Melanie Virginia Morgan (born November 11, 1967) is an American politician serving as a Democratic member of the Washington House of Representatives, representing the 29th legislative district.

Career
Morgan is a veteran of the United States Army.

She was appointed by the Pierce County Council as a member of the Pierce County Housing Authority, and she also served on the Board of Community Healthcare.

Morgan was first elected to the Franklin-Pierce School Board in 2015. Morgan was elected to the Washington House of Representatives in 2018, defeating Republican Terry Harder. In the primary, Morgan and Harder advanced to the general election defeating the incumbent David Sawyer.

Morgan sponsored House bill 1016 to designate June 19 ("Juneteenth") as a state holiday. The House passed the bill in February on an 89-9 vote. The bill passed the Democratic-led Senate on a bipartisan 47-1. Governor Jay Inslee signed the bill on May 13, 2021.

See also
List of Democratic Socialists of America who have held office in the United States

References

African-American state legislators in Washington (state)
Democratic Socialists of America politicians from Washington
Morgan, Melanie
Living people
21st-century American politicians
21st-century American women politicians
Women state legislators in Washington (state)
1967 births
21st-century African-American women
21st-century African-American politicians
20th-century African-American people
20th-century African-American women